Gordon Raphael is an American record producer and musician from Seattle, Washington, and New York, currently living in Hebden Bridge (UK), after a few years in Berlin. Raphael is most widely known for his work with The Strokes, whom he met while attending an early show at Luna Lounge on Ludlow Street, New York City. He produced their debut EP The Modern Age as well as their first two albums Is This It and Room on Fire. The EP and first album were recorded entirely in his basement studio Transporterraum NYC (co-owned by Jimmy Goodman). He has also produced many songs with Sarah Maguire, Fake Chemical State for ex-Skunk Anansie lead singer Skin, Mexico's top rock band Fobia, and the well-loved album Soviet Kitsch by Regina Spektor. 

Other notables he has worked with include Damon Albarn, Ian Astbury and Ian Brown. As far as recording rock music: from Bognor Regis Kill Kenada, Britain's The Moonies, the London band Three Trapped Tigers, operatic art rockers Ox.Eagle.Lion.Man, Swiss literary-rock band The Mondrians, Finland's Caroline Taucher and The Whas, UK artists Charly Flynn and The Sound Explosion. He worked as engineer, and played keyboards, on all of New York singer-songwriter Roxanne Fontana's second album, Souvenirs d'Amour.

Career

Early career 
As a musician, Raphael formed two bands in Seattle, Mental Mannequin and Colour Twigs. He was also the keyboardist for the Seattle-based psychedelic band Sky Cries Mary and part of a dark-wave band called Absinthee with Anna Mercedes. His favorite instrument is the Arp Odyssey, which he started learning at age 18. This small 1970's analog synthesizer creates an infinite pallet of evocative, intense outer space noises as well as a barrage of bass which he uses on many of his own and other artist's recordings.

2000s: The Strokes and work in Europe 
Raphael moved to London in 2002 following the success of Is This It, and founded a studio there called The Silver Transporterraum of London. In his first year living there, he worked with thirty bands, and was asked to produce the debut album of The Libertines whilst mixing live sound on their first-ever UK Tour (with The Vines and The Strokes). Rapahel also began curating a club night called The Basement Club with Transgressive Records co-founder Toby L,  presented very early concerts by Regina Spektor, Bloc Party, The Libertines, and Raphael's own band Black Light among many others.

In 2005, after working for almost a year on The Strokes album First Impressions of Earth, Raphael was replaced as producer by David Kahne. 

He moved to Berlin to be close to his friend, producer Moses Schneider. From his Berlin base, many European bands began to contact him via the internet to work, including Zeno and the Stoics (Madrid), Mikkel Glasser (Copenhagen), Satellites (Mallorca), Big Deal (London), A Brand (Brussels), Deportivo (Paris), Scanners (London), Olivia Anna Livki (Berlin), Super 700 (Berlin), Ian Astbury (London), Eva Loft (Berlin), and The Michelles (Berlin).

2010s: Further international work and original music 
In January 2010, Raphael went to Cape Town, South Africa, to produce the debut album Shark by indie rock band The Plastics. 

In 2011-2012, Raphael worked in San Antonio, Texas with Education, The Dirty Clergy, Ill Prospekt and Victoria Celestine. He then met Ricky Berger and co-engineered her new collection of songs. Around the time of Hurricane Sandy, he was back for a rare visit to Manhattan producing an album for Lewis Lazar, then luckily being called to his beloved Seattle for an album with Ben Ireland (a drummer that Raphael worked closely with in many of his own musical bands including Mental Mannequin, The Tears of Gloom, and Sky Cries Mary). Whilst in the Pacific Northwest, Raphael was introduced to The Tempers, a "wild-electronic band of brother and sisters" and recorded three demos with them.

In May 2013, he went to Lima, Perú, to record a Peruvian new band called Los Outsaiders. In October 2013, he went to Seattle, Washington, and recorded a 7-song EP with Red Martian. In April 2014, Raphael went to Mexico City and recorded a 6-song EP with the up-and-coming band Sol Flamingo while simultaneously filming a small documentary on "the making" of it with Montreal based filmmaker Patrick Barbeau.

Raphael performed at British & Irish Modern Music Institute in Berlin (BIMM) in March 2016.

In March 2018, Raphael released his "first proper solo album" SLEEP ON THE RADIO via Zero Hours Records in London. This record was mostly recorded in Buenos Aires. 

Then a fortunate development occurred when rising Argentinian musician Rocco Posca asked Raphael to produce his new album, Fervor for Sony Music. In June 2018, these recording sessions began, and on the first day Maria Florencia Silva, one of the musicians on SLEEP ON THE RADIO offered to start a new band with Raphael, called The Wild Cards which toured throughout South America in 2018.

On January 1, 2019, Raphael released his album I Lick The Moog, which had been recorded in his old NYC Studio Transporterraum during Christmas 2000, four months before the recording of The Strokes Is This It began. At that time Raphael, was actually living in the studio, in a basement under Avenue A. The album contains some songs, mixed with experimental soundscapes and electronic atmosphere's created on his beloved Arp Odyssey, a Jupiter 6 and Mini Moog.

Gordon Raphael's memoir The World Is Going To Love This - Up From The Basement With The Strokes, will be published by Wordville in 2022.

Production discography

References

External links
 Gordotronic Website
 First Major Interview
 Silhouette Shack original PODCAST
 Shoplifter Records UK site
 Urchin Studios official website
the mixtape chats with Gordon Raphael
the mixtape chats with Gordon Raphael: Part 2
Los Outsaiders, el grupo peruano que llamó la atención del productor de The Strokes
Interview with Gordon Raphael - New BIMM Instructor and Producer of The Strokes. 

Year of birth missing (living people)
Living people
Record producers from Washington (state)
Businesspeople from Seattle